The Play-offs of the 2009 Fed Cup Americas Zone Group I were the final stages of the Group I Zonal Competition involving teams from the Americas. Using the positions determined in their pools, the six teams faced off to determine their placing in the 2009 Fed Cup Americas Zone Group I, the top countries of each pool played for first to second, while the bottom two of each pool competed for fifth to eighth. The top team advanced to the World Group II, and the bottom two teams were relegated down to the Group II for the next year.

Promotion play-offs
The top team of each pool was placed against each other in a head-to-head round. The winner of the round advanced to World Group II for next year.

Canada vs. Paraguay

Relegation play-offs
The last two placed teams of each pool were drawn against each other in two head-to-head rounds. The losing team was relegated to Group II for the next year.

Puerto Rico vs. Brazil

Bahamas vs. Colombia

Final Placements

  advanced to the World Group II Play-offs, and were drawn against . They lost 2–3, and thus they were relegated back to Group I for 2010.

See also
Fed Cup structure

References

External links
 Fed Cup website

2009 Fed Cup Americas Zone